On 30 March 1985, a bomb exploded inside the Rivoli Beaubourg cinema in the 4th arrondissement of Paris, France, where an annual Jewish film festival was being held. At the time the German film Eichmann und das Dritte Reich (1961) about the Holocaust was being screened. 

Eighteen people were wounded when the bomb exploded, planted under a seat, causing a hole and damage to the ceiling. The organisers received an anonymous letter a week before about to "blow everything up, including the director" of the festival. The bombing caused  fears of a rise of racism and anti-Semitism in France, and came not long after two Arabs were killed in southern France in racially-motivated attacks.

The next day, some 6,000 demonstrators including political and cinema elite marched around the cinema and a Jewish memorial near the Hôtel de Ville protesting against the attack. President François Mitterrand also condemned the attack.

Police said both far-right and far-left groups were the main suspects. Two neo-Nazi groups reportedly claimed responsibility but police found it uncredible. Nobody was ever convicted of the attack.

Fabrice Nicolino, who was wounded in the blast, would again fall victim to a terror attack in Paris 30 years later in the Charlie Hebdo shooting, in which he was critically injured at a leg.

See also
1980 Paris synagogue bombing
Goldenberg restaurant attack
February 1985 Paris bombing
1988 attack on Saint-Michel cinema in Paris

References

1985 in French cinema
1985 in Paris
1985 in Judaism
Improvised explosive device bombings in 1985
Improvised explosive device bombings in Paris
Terrorist incidents in France in 1985
March 1985 events in Europe
March 1985 crimes
Improvised explosive device bombings in France
1985 crimes in France
Terrorist incidents in France
Antisemitic attacks and incidents in Europe
Antisemitism in France
Attacks on cinemas
Building bombings in France
Terrorist incidents by unknown perpetrators
Le Marais